The following is a list of films originally produced and/or distributed theatrically by Metro-Goldwyn-Mayer and released between 1980 and 1989.

(company known as Metro-Goldwyn-Mayer Film Co., MGM/UA Entertainment Co., MGM Entertainment Co. and MGM/UA Communications Co.)

See also 
 Lists of Metro-Goldwyn-Mayer films

References 

1980-1989
American films by studio
1980s in American cinema
Lists of 1980s films